Alessandro Bottoni (born October 13, 1972) is a triathlete from Italy.

Bottoni competed at the first Olympic triathlon at the 2000 Summer Olympics.  He took thirty-second place with a total time of 1:51:18.13.

References

Italian male triathletes
Triathletes at the 2000 Summer Olympics
1972 births
Living people
Olympic triathletes of Italy